Holman's Bridge is a brick-built bridge on the A413 to the north of Aylesbury in Buckinghamshire, England.  It is where the A413 road crosses the River Thame.  Aylesbury's first Charter of Incorporation in 1554 marked Holman's Bridge as the northernmost boundary of the town.

History
It was the location, in 1642, of the Battle of Aylesbury, where although heavily outnumbered a Parliamentarian garrison under Sir William Balfour took the town of Aylesbury from the Royalist forces of Prince Rupert.  After the battle the bodies of the dead were thrown into a common grave near the bridge.  In 1818 they were exhumed and their bones moved to a common grave in nearby Hardwick.

In 2006 work began to add a wooden pedestrian bridge alongside the existing bridge to provide pedestrian access to the new Weedon Hill housing estate. The housing development is controversially being built on the tract of land where the battle took place.

References

External links 
 Image of the common grave in Hardwick at Buckinghamshire Photographs

Aylesbury
Bridges in Buckinghamshire